The Nissan 200SX (originally Datsun 200SX until the early 1980s) is an automobile nameplate that has been used on various export specification Nissan automobiles between 1975 and 2002.

Nissan Silvia based 

Between 1975 and 2002, Nissan retailed the Silvia as the 200SX in some export markets. Six generations were constructed, with new models released in 1979, 1984, 1989, 1993, and 1999. A number of these cars, in both coupe and hatchback body styles, received different nameplates depending on the importers.

Nissan Lucino based 

Between 1995 and 1998, Nissan retailed the Lucino coupe as the 200SX in the United States and Canada.

See also 

 Nissan 180SX
 Nissan 240SX

200SX
Cars introduced in 1975
Rally cars